Murad Beg Khan was briefly the Khan of Kokand after he killed Shir Ali Khan. After requesting the assistance of the Emirate of Bukhara, Musulmonqul travelled to Namangan and gave his daughter as a "gift" to Khudayar before brought the young Khudayar to Kokand, where he was declared Khan with Musulmonqul as regent. Murad had been khan for only eleven days before he was killed and Khudayar put in power.

References

1812 births
1845 deaths
19th-century monarchs in Asia
19th-century murdered monarchs
Khans of Kokand
People from Kokand